Davenport is a village in Thayer County, Nebraska, United States. The population was 321 at the 2020 census.

History
In 1872, the village was platted by the Nebraska Land and Town Company, and the St. Joseph and Denver City railroad line (later taken over by Union Pacific) was built through the site of village. It was named after Davenport, Iowa. In 1887, the village was officially incorporated. In 1888, North Western Railroad also built a line through the village. Two railroad lines with passenger and freight service brought much business to the village and helped support several hotels.

The public school was established in 1877. A Methodist Society was organized in 1881, a Church of Christ in 1882, Christ's Lutheran Church in 1892, and St. Peter's Lutheran in 1912.

Major fires destroyed large sections of the business district in 1889, 1917, and 2011.

Also, a Lutheran school once existed, St. Peters Lutheran School, but was closed in 2010 because of lack of students.

Geography
Davenport is located at  (40.313312, -97.812490).

Demographics

2010 census
As of the census of 2010, there were 294 people, 141 households, and 83 families residing in the village. The racial makeup of the village was 96.3% White, 1.4% from other races, and 2.4% from two or more races. Hispanic or Latino of any race were 2.4% of the population.

There were 141 households, of which 22.0% had children under the age of 18 living with them, 51.1% were married couples living together, 6.4% had a female householder with no husband present, 1.4% had a male householder with no wife present, and 41.1% were non-families. 39.0% of all households were made up of individuals, and 23.4% had someone living alone who was 65 years of age or older. The average household size was 2.09 and the average family size was 2.77.

The median age in the village was 53 years. 20.7% of residents were under the age of 18; 5.2% were between the ages of 18 and 24; 17% were from 25 to 44; 24.8% were from 45 to 64; and 32.3% were 65 years of age or older. The gender makeup of the village was 46.3% male and 53.7% female.

2000 census
As of the census of 2000, there were 339 people, 160 households, and 106 families residing in the village. The population density was 513.0 people per square mile (198.3/km2). There were 180 housing units at an average density of 272.4 per square mile (105.3/km2). The racial makeup of the village was 98.23% White, 0.29% from other races, and 1.47% from two or more races. Hispanic or Latino of any race were 1.18% of the population.

There were 160 households, out of which 22.5% had children under the age of 18 living with them, 58.8% were married couples living together, 6.3% had a female householder with no husband present, and 33.8% were non-families. 31.3% of all households were made up of individuals, and 18.8% had someone living alone who was 65 years of age or older. The average household size was 2.12 and the average family size was 2.64.

In the village, the population was spread out, with 21.5% under the age of 18, 3.2% from 18 to 24, 22.1% from 25 to 44, 20.9% from 45 to 64, and 32.2% who were 65 years of age or older. The median age was 49 years. For every 100 females, there were 86.3 males. For every 100 females age 18 and over, there were 86.0 males.

As of 2000 the median income for a household in the village was $26,964, and the median income for a family was $33,958. Males had a median income of $23,929 versus $16,563 for females. The per capita income for the village was $13,960. About 11.4% of families and 12.9% of the population were below the poverty line, including 8.0% of those under age 18 and 19.3% of those age 65 or over.

References

External links
Davenport Community Improvement Program
A History of Davenport, Nebraska, Thayer County, 1872-1966 by Clare B. Row

Villages in Thayer County, Nebraska
Villages in Nebraska